"In My House" is a song produced, written and arranged by American musician Rick James and recorded by his protégées, the Mary Jane Girls, for their second studio album, Only Four You (1985). It was released as the album's lead single in October 1984 by Gordy Records. In the United States, the single topped Billboard Dance Club Songs chart in April 1985 and remained atop the chart for two weeks. It also reached the top 10 on both the Billboard Hot 100 and Billboard Hot R&B/Hip-Hop Songs chart, peaking at number seven on the Hot 100 in June 1985 and remained in the top 40 for 12 weeks. It is the group's highest-peaking single and their only top-40 entry on the Billboard Hot 100, although they have had other singles succeed on both the R&B and dance charts.

In 1984, the Parents Music Resource Center (PMRC) was organized in the United States to draw attention to music which the group believed contained inappropriate content for children. "In My House" was chosen on the group's "Filthy Fifteen" list due to its alleged sexual innuendo. However, during the VH1 100 Greatest One Hit Wonders of the 80s program, the group went on record as saying the song is about love, not sex. The group's follow-up single, "Wild and Crazy Love", was even more suggestive in its lyrical content, but the PMRC was not known to have attacked it as openly as it condemned "In My House".

In 2009, VH1 ranked "In My House" number 52 on its program 100 Greatest One Hit Wonders of the 80s.

Track listings
7-inch single
A. "In My House" – 3:59
B. "In My House" (instrumental) – 5:00

12-inch single
A. "In My House" (12" version) – 5:00
B. "In My House" (instrumental 12" version) – 7:16

Charts

Weekly charts

Year-end charts

See also
 List of number-one dance singles of 1985 (U.S.)

References

1985 singles
1985 songs
Gordy Records singles
Mary Jane Girls songs
Song recordings produced by Rick James
Songs written by Rick James
Motown singles